West Vancouver-Howe Sound was a provincial electoral district in the Canadian province of British Columbia from 1966 to 1986.  The riding's predecessor  was North Vancouver, which first appeared on the hustings from 1903.

For other historical and current ridings in the region see Vancouver (electoral districts).

Demographics

Political geography

Notable elections

Notable MLAs

Electoral history 

 
|Liberal
|Louis Allan Williams
|align="right"|8,346 	
|align="right"|52.76%
|align="right"|
|align="right"|unknown

|- bgcolor="white"
!align="right" colspan=3|Total valid votes
!align="right"|15,820 	
!align="right"|100.00%
!align="right"|
|- bgcolor="white"
!align="right" colspan=3|Total rejected ballots
!align="right"|171
!align="right"|
!align="right"|
|- bgcolor="white"
!align="right" colspan=3|Turnout
!align="right"|%
!align="right"|
!align="right"|
|}

 
|Liberal
|Louis Allan Williams
|align="right"|8,974 		 	
|align="right"|46.39%
|align="right"|
|align="right"|unknown

 
|New Democrat
|William Basil Mundy
|align="right"|2,939 		 	
|align="right"|15.19%
|align="right"|
|align="right"|unknown
|- bgcolor="white"
!align="right" colspan=3|Total valid votes
!align="right"|19,346 
!align="right"|100.00%
!align="right"|
|- bgcolor="white"
!align="right" colspan=3|Total rejected ballots
!align="right"|131
!align="right"|
!align="right"|
|- bgcolor="white"
!align="right" colspan=3|Turnout
!align="right"|%
!align="right"|
!align="right"|
|}

 
|Liberal
|Louis Allan Williams
|align="right"|7,597 	 	
|align="right"|33.93%
|align="right"|
|align="right"|unknown
 
|Progressive Conservative
|Peter Stewart Hyndman
|align="right"|7,076 		
|align="right"|31.60%
|align="right"|
|align="right"|unknown

|- bgcolor="white"
!align="right" colspan=3|Total valid votes
!align="right"|22,390 	
!align="right"|100.00%
!align="right"|
|- bgcolor="white"
!align="right" colspan=3|Total rejected ballots
!align="right"|158
!align="right"|
!align="right"|
|- bgcolor="white"
!align="right" colspan=3|Turnout
!align="right"|%
!align="right"|
!align="right"|
|}

 
|Liberal
|Cordelia Kitty Maracle
|align="right"|3,263 	 	 	
|align="right"|12.99%
|align="right"|
|align="right"|unknown
 
|Progressive Conservative
|Francis Bernard Jameson
|align="right"|998 		
|align="right"|3.97%
|align="right"|
|align="right"|unknown

|- bgcolor="white"
!align="right" colspan=3|Total valid votes
!align="right"|25,115 	
!align="right"|100.00%
!align="right"|
|- bgcolor="white"
!align="right" colspan=3|Total rejected ballots
!align="right"|261
!align="right"|
!align="right"|
|- bgcolor="white"
!align="right" colspan=3|Turnout
!align="right"|%
!align="right"|
!align="right"|
|}

 
|Progressive Conservative
|Christopher Derrick England
|align="right"|1,916 		
|align="right"|7.86%
|align="right"|
|align="right"|unknown

|- bgcolor="white"
!align="right" colspan=3|Total valid votes
!align="right"|24,381 	
!align="right"|100.00%
!align="right"|
|- bgcolor="white"
!align="right" colspan=3|Total rejected ballots
!align="right"|459
!align="right"|
!align="right"|
|- bgcolor="white"
!align="right" colspan=3|Turnout
!align="right"|%
!align="right"|
!align="right"|
|}

 
|Liberal
|Morton Alexander Graham
|align="right"|1,941 		 	
|align="right"|6.92%
|align="right"|
|align="right"|unknown
 
|Progressive Conservative
|Neil Stewart Thompson
|align="right"|1,824 	
|align="right"|6.50%
|align="right"|
|align="right"|unknown

|Independents
|James Roland Chabot
|align="right"|316 	 	 	
|align="right"|1.12%
|align="right"|
|- bgcolor="white"
!align="right" colspan=3|Total valid votes
!align="right"|28,065 		 
!align="right"|100.00%
!align="right"|
|- bgcolor="white"
!align="right" colspan=3|Total rejected ballots
!align="right"|234
!align="right"|
!align="right"|
|- bgcolor="white"
!align="right" colspan=3|Turnout
!align="right"|%
!align="right"|
!align="right"|
|}

 
|Liberal
|Ed Carlin
|align="right"|6,786 			 	
|align="right"|25.26%
|align="right"|
|align="right"|unknown

|- bgcolor="white"
!align="right" colspan=3|Total valid votes
!align="right"|26,867
!align="right"|100.00%
!align="right"|
|- bgcolor="white"
!align="right" colspan=3|Total rejected ballots
!align="right"|265
!align="right"|
!align="right"|
|- bgcolor="white"
!align="right" colspan=3|Turnout
!align="right"|%
!align="right"|
!align="right"|
|}

References 
Elections BC Historical Returns

Former provincial electoral districts of British Columbia
West Vancouver